The West Michigan Symphony (formerly the West Shore Symphony Orchestra) is a professional orchestra made up of 60 core musicians, performing at the Frauenthal Center for the Performing Arts in Muskegon, Michigan.  The current Music Director/Conductor is Scott Speck. The Orchestra performs eight concerts annually (five Masterworks and three Pops) many with guest artists, playing a variety of music.

History 
A. M. Courtright, a Muskegon Heights teacher, and Palmer Quackenbush are credited with early efforts to provide Muskegon with a symphony orchestra. In November 1939 a musical group of 50 members presented its first concert, with Quackenbush conducting and Courtright assisting. The group incorporated the following year and elected its first board of directors.

Performances were initially held in area schools and in the late 1970s moved to the historic Frauenthal Theater. Built in 1929, the 1724 seat Frauenthal Center for the Performing Arts underwent a $7.5 million renovation that restored it to its original Spanish Renaissance styling while also creating a lobby linking it with the adjacent 180 seat Beardsley Theatre. 

On May 15, 2013, WMS moved its offices into new headquarters on the second floor of the Russell Block Building at 360 W. Western Avenue. The Block, an 1800 square-feet space adjacent to the offices, is a concert and education space and a rental facility for weddings and special events. With seating for up to 150, it features a lounge and dressing room area, small balcony, windows facing Muskegon Lake, and an outdoor deck made of recycled materials with green spaces. The Block allows WMS to increase its presence in downtown Muskegon by expanding its ticket operations on the first floor and presenting smaller concerts at The Block, welcoming artists in genres from classical, to cabaret, to alternative.

Music direction

West Michigan Symphony has had nine conductors. They have included Palmer Quackenbush (1939-1949), Tauno Hannikainen (1949-1951), Hugo Kolberg (1951-1956), Wayne L. Dunlap (1956-1959), Lyman A. Starr, Sr. (1959-1961), John L. Wheeler (1961-1977), Philip Greenberg (1977-1981), Murray Gross (1982-2001) and current Music Director Scott Speck who has held the position since 2002.

Speck also serves as Artistic Director of the Chicago Philharmonic Orchestra and Music Director of the Mobile Symphony in (AL) and the Joffrey Ballet in Chicago. Additionally, he has served in leadership roles with the Los Angeles Opera, San Francisco Ballet, the Washington Ballet (DC) and the Honolulu Symphony, and as Principal Guest Conductor of the China Film Philharmonic in Beijing.

Speck has conducted at well-known venues including the Kennedy Center in Washington, D.C., the Royal Opera House in London, and Tchaikovsky Hall in Moscow. He is also the co-author of three books in the For Dummies series, including classical music, opera and ballet.

Governance and Management

Fewer than six weeks after the first concert was held on November 28, 1939, representatives from Grand Haven and Muskegon began to develop by-laws and to form a permanent Board of Directors for the Symphony. 

The first mention of finding someone to manage the Orchestra appeared in the minutes for the August 23, 1944 meeting of the Board, when Harriet Damm, Chair, announced that Robert Sanborn "was willing to try to be orchestra manager."  His job description was to check attendance at rehearsals and concerts, distribute and collect the scores and music racks, and have the piano tuned.

In 1984 Susan Schwartz became Manager. Schwartz was followed by Barbara Klingman, 1985 to 1986, and Janet Smith, 1987-1996. Gretchen Cheney-Rhoades was hired as Executive in the spring of 1996.

In March 2004 Brenda Nienhouse of Grand Haven was given the position with the title of President and CEO.  She was one of 41 candidates selected during a nationwide search that started in the summer of 2003, when Ms. Cheney-Rhoades resigned.

Carla Hill, current President and CEO, joined the Symphony in September 2005. Hill came to the Symphony after serving as Marketing and Public Relations Director for The Columbus Symphony Orchestra (OH) and the Omaha Symphony Orchestra (NE).

Musical groups established in 1938
Orchestras based in Michigan
Muskegon, Michigan